Freight Runners Express is a US air carrier based in Milwaukee, Wisconsin, United States. The airline operates scheduled and on-demand air cargo and passenger services. Passenger air charter services are also operated under the Air Charter Express (ACE) brand using Embraer EMB-120 and Saab 2000 aircraft. Freight Runners is headquartered at Milwaukee Mitchell International Airport in Milwaukee.

Company history 
Freight Runners Express began operations in 1985 flying cargo across the state of Wisconsin. Passenger operations began in 1992 with the launch of the Air Charter Express brand.

Current fleet 

As of December 2022, the Freight Runners Express fleet consists of the following aircraft:

Historical fleet 
Freight Runners Express has operated many aircraft types in its history.

Notes:
 The Cessna 402 fleet was originally operated in an interchangeable passenger and cargo configuration. In 2006 the fleet was permanently converted to an all cargo configuration.

Statistics 
Freight Runners Express flies 7,155,00 pounds of cargo per calendar year. The fleet will fly an average of 2,150,000 miles, arriving at 390 cities and carrying 18,500 passengers. This is achieved with 9,570 flights totaling 8,400 hours of flight time.

References

External links
Freight Runners Express

Airlines based in Wisconsin
Airlines established in 1985
Cargo airlines of the United States
Companies based in Milwaukee
1985 establishments in Wisconsin